Miss Grand Spain 2019 is the 4th  edition of Miss Grand Spain beauty contest, held at Hotel Campomar, Arnuero Cantabria on 6 July 2019. The Miss Grand Spain 2019 is Ainara de Santamaría from Cantabria crowned her successor, Ainara de Santamaría then represented Spain at the Miss Grand International 2019 pageant held on October 25 in Venezuela.

Results

Contestants
31 delegates were selected by regional licensees to compete for the national title of Miss Grand Spain 2019.

References

External links

 Miss Grand Spain official website

Grand Spain
Miss Grand Spain
Beauty pageants in Spain